Beside Myself was Ray Stevens' twenty-sixth studio album and his sixth for MCA Records, released in 1989. It includes the singles "I Saw Elvis in a UFO" and "There's a Star Spangled Banner." The album was also his last for MCA Records before he moved to Curb Records for his next studio album, 1990's Lend Me Your Ears.

A repackaged version of this album, Ray Stevens — At His Best (MCAC-20695 cassette, MCAD-20695 CD), was released on December 18, 1992 with most of the same tracks in a different order, eliminating the tracks "Bad Dancin'" and "I Used to Be Crazy." A different version of At His Best, with all ten tracks from Beside Myself in the original order, is available on iTunes.

Track listing
"Your Bozo’s Back Again" - 3:51
"Another Fine Mess" - 3:19
"Marion Michael Morrison" - 3:53
"Butterfly Inside a Coupe de Ville" - 3:12
"There’s a Star Spangled Banner" - 3:38
"I Saw Elvis in a U.F.O." - 3:34
"The Woogie Boogie" - 2:23
"Stuck on You" - 3:18
"Bad Dancin’" - 2:48
"I Used to Be Crazy" - 2:45

All songs written by Ray Stevens and C.W. Kalb, Jr.; “Bad Dancin’”, co-written by Cinde Borup and Bruce Innis.

Personnel 
Compiled from liner notes.

Musicians
 Ray Stevens – lead vocals, backing vocals, synthesizers
 Gary Prim – keyboards
 Mark Casstevens – rhythm guitars 
 Steve Gibson – electric guitars
 Stuart Keathley – bass guitar
 Tommy Wells – drums
 Terry McMillan – harmonica
 Denis Solee – tenor saxophone
 Vicki Hampton – backing vocals
 Sheri Huffman – backing vocals
 Lisa Silver – backing vocals
 Diane Vanette – backing vocals

Production
 Ray Stevens – producer, arrangements, art direction 
 Stuart Keathley – engineer 
 Glenn Meadows – mastering 
 Slick Lawson – art direction, photography 
 Susan Lawson – stying, make-up
 Recorded at Ray Stevens Studio (Nashville, Tennessee).
 Mastered at Masterfonics (Nashville, Tennessee).

Chart performance

See also
 Ray Stevens discography

References

1989 albums
Ray Stevens albums
MCA Records albums